Chelsey Brodt-Rosenthal (born December 7, 1983) is an American ice hockey defender, currently playing with the Minnesota Whitecaps of the National Women's Hockey League (NWHL).

Playing career  
During her teenage years, Brodt-Rosenthal played for Roseville Area High School in her hometown of Roseville, Minnesota, winning the state championship in 1999. 

From 2002 to 2006, she played for the Minnesota Golden Gophers women's ice hockey program, scoring 43 points in 151 NCAA Division I games played. She won a national championship with the team in 2004.

In 2010, she won the Clarkson Cup with the independent Minnesota Whitecaps, scoring the opening goal three minutes into the championship game in a 4–0 victory over the Brampton Thunder.

She stayed with the Whitecaps as the team joined the NWHL in 2018, picking up four points in fourteen games in her debut NWHL season and helping the team to an Isobel Cup championship.

Style of play 
Brodt-Rosenthal is known for a physical and defensive style of play. During her time with the Minnesota Golden Gophers, her plus/minus (+/-) per season never dropped below +15, and she notched a total of 146 penalty minutes. In her first NWHL season with the Whitecaps, she finished tied for third on the team in blocked shots.

Personal life 
Brodt-Rosenthal comes from a large family of Minnesotan hockey players. Her father, Jack Brodt, co-founded the Whitecaps and currently serves as the team's general manager, while her sister Winny Brodt-Brown currently plays alongside her for the club. Her niece, Madeline Wethington, has represented the United States at three different IIHF World Women's U18 Championships. In 2017, she and her family were inducted into the Herb Brooks Foundation Youth Hockey Hall of Fame.

Outside of hockey, she has worked as a trainer for Life Time Fitness and as the Midwest Customer Manager for Clif Bar.

References

External links 
 

1983 births
Living people
American women's ice hockey defensemen
People from Roseville, Minnesota
Ice hockey players from Minnesota
Minnesota Whitecaps players
Minnesota Golden Gophers women's ice hockey players
Clarkson Cup champions
Isobel Cup champions
Premier Hockey Federation players